Maclovio Rojas is a city in Baja California, located  in Tijuana Municipality.

References

Populated places in Tijuana Municipality